Steve Chia Kiah Hong (born 3 November 1970) is a Singaporean politician. A member of the opposition Singapore People's Party (SPP), he has been the party's secretary-general since 2019.

Chia started his political career when he joined the opposition National Solidarity Party (NSP) in 1995 and served as the party's secretary-general from 2001 to 2005. During this time, he contested in four general elections, as a NSP candidate in 1997 and 2011, and under the Singapore Democratic Alliance (SDA) banner in 2001 and 2006 when the NSP was part of the SDA. However, he lost in all four elections to candidates from the governing People's Action Party (PAP). Nevertheless, he took up a seat in the 10th Parliament as a Non-constituency Member of Parliament from 2001 to 2006.

Chia withdrew from contesting in MacPherson SMC during the 2015 general election after he received online criticism for pushing the NSP to contest in a three-cornered fight in MacPherson against the PAP and the opposition Workers' Party. He left the NSP and joined the SPP in 2018 and became the party's secretary-general in the following year. During the 2020 general election, he contested as part of a five-member SPP team in Bishan–Toa Payoh GRC, but they lost to the PAP team.

Early life
In his youth, Chia was a delinquent who had vandalised school property and had been sent to a boys' home and placed under probation. After that, he went to junior college, where he was a student councillor. While serving his National Service, he got into the Officer Cadet School and served as a manpower officer in a reserve unit of the Singapore Armed Forces.

After completing his National Service, Chia read psychology and philosophy at the National University of Singapore (NUS). During his time in NUS, he was active in student politics and was elected president of the 15th NUS Student Union in this third year.

Political career

1997 general election
After graduating from NUS in 1994, Chia met Tan Chee Kien, the president of the opposition National Solidarity Party (NSP). He joined the party around the end of 1994 and gradually rose to the position of the party's assistant secretary-general and eventually secretary-general. During the 1997 general election, he joined Tan and four others to form a six-member NSP team to contest in Hong Kah GRC against a six-member team from the governing People's Action Party (PAP) led by Environment Minister Yeo Cheow Tong. The NSP team lost after garnering 31% of the vote against the PAP team's 69%.

2001 general election
In June 2001, the NSP, under Chia's leadership, joined three other opposition parties (SPP, PKMS and SJP) to form the Singapore Democratic Alliance (SDA). In the general election that year, Chia contested as a solo candidate under the SDA banner in Chua Chu Kang SMC. Although Chia ultimately lost to the PAP candidate Low Seow Chay with 34.66% of the vote against Low's 65.34%, he was offered a seat as a Non-constituency Member of Parliament (NCMP) in the 10th Parliament because he was one of the "best losers" in an election in which there were fewer than six elected opposition Members of Parliament. At the time, the 30-year-old Chia was the youngest parliamentarian.

During his term as a NCMP from 5 November 2001 to 18 April 2006, Chia posed questions in Parliament on various issues, including National Service, HDB flats for singles, bus and train fare subsidies, and organ transplants. Chia claimed in a 2020 interview with Mothership that he asked the highest number of questions among all the Members of Parliament in the 10th Parliament.

2006 general election
During the 2006 general election, Chia contested in Chua Chu Kang SMC again as a SDA candidate, this time against PAP candidate Gan Kim Yong. He lost after garnering 39.63% of the vote against Gan's 60.37%,

2011 general election
The NSP withdrew from the SDA in 2007, so Chia contested under the NSP banner during the 2011 general election, this time in Pioneer SMC. He lost after garnering 39.27% of the vote against the PAP candidate Cedric Foo, who won with 60.73%.

2015 general election
Ahead of the 2015 general election, the NSP announced that it planned to field Chia as a candidate in MacPherson SMC. This was a controversial decision as another opposition party, the Workers' Party, had already announced that they would have a candidate contesting against the PAP in MacPherson SMC. On 22 August 2015, Chia released a statement on Facebook announcing that he had decided not to contest in the 2015 general election because he had received a lot of online criticism for pushing the NSP to renege on its deal to avoid a three-cornered fight in MacPherson SMC.

2020 general election
Chia eventually left the NSP and joined another opposition party, the Singapore People's Party (SPP), and became its organising secretary. He was elected secretary-general of the SPP on 5 November 2019.

During the 2020 general election, Chia led a five-member SPP team to contest in Bishan–Toa Payoh GRC against a five-member PAP team led by Defence Minister Ng Eng Hen. The SPP team lost with 32.77% of the vote against the PAP team's 67.23%.

Controversies

2003 nude photo scandal
In 2003, Chia's wife Doreen, who was then pregnant with their first child, made a police report against her husband, alleging that he had molested their Indonesian domestic helper. The report came after she discovered photos of him and their helper, both naked, in the recycle bin of his computer. Their helper told the police that she was not forced into posing for the pictures, while Chia publicly admitted to taking the photos, confessing that he had an interest in nude photography. Chia also resigned from his positions as NSP secretary-general and SDA executive council member to save the NSP and SDA from further embarrassment, but remained a NCMP.

2006 driving incident
In 2006, Chia was fined for driving his car across a traffic junction when the red light was on, resulting in a crash with a bus.

Personal life
Chia met his wife, Doreen Chee, during a trip to climb Mount Ophir when they were both studying at the National University of Singapore in the early 1990s. They married in 1996 and have two sons and one daughter. They divorced later in 2017.

Notes

References

External links
 Singapore People’s Party CEC Members

Living people
1970 births
Singaporean Non-constituency Members of Parliament
National Solidarity Party (Singapore) politicians
National University of Singapore alumni
Singaporean people of Teochew descent
Singapore People's Party politicians